Clarence Deming (October 1, 1848 – May 8, 1913) was an American journalist who wrote for the New York Evening Post for nine years. He was also an editorial writer for the Railway Age Gazette, and a writer on athletics and Yale history in general.

He was also known as a college football and baseball player for the Yale Bulldogs' early teams. He was for two years captain of the baseball team.

References

External links
 

1848 births
1913 deaths
19th-century players of American football
Yale Bulldogs baseball players
Yale Bulldogs football players
People from Litchfield, Connecticut
American journalists